Černelavci is a village in the Municipality of Murska Sobota in the Prekmurje region of northeastern Slovenia.

The writer György Czipott was born here.

References

External links 
 Černelavci on Geopedia

Populated places in the City Municipality of Murska Sobota